Yousef "Joe" Sweid (born 22 June 1976) is an Arab-Israeli actor and dancer.

Early and personal life
Yousef Sweid was born in Haifa, Israel, to a Christian-Arab family. He is a graduate of the theater department at Tel Aviv University. 

Sweid was married to Jewish-Israeli Yael Ronen, a director at the Cameri Theatre. They had a son in 2009. In 2015 they divorced. In 2018, he married  Jewish-Israeli television host Adi Shilon. Their daughter was born in October 2019. They reside mostly in Berlin, Germany.

Theater and film career
He started out by joining the Arab-Hebrew Theater in Jaffa. He went on to participate in television shows including Dancing again tonight (1991), Lane of White Chairs (a winner at the 1996 Acre Festival), Oh Brother Boom Boom (which in 2003 won at the Haifa festival for children's programming), Dragon (2004), and Immigrants (2005).

On stage, he performed alongside Ruth Kanner in 2001's Things you can see from here, you cannot see from there; in 2002 he appeared in Sea Shadow.

Sweid also participated in the international production The Time We Did Not Know Anything About Each Other, and in the dance production Barefoot. In 2001 he became director of a community theater program for both Arabs and Jews in Ramla, a town with mixed population in Israel.

In 2016, he played in one episode of the HBO series Game of Thrones in its 6th season, as a Meereenese freedman.

Filmography
 2002 : It's Not Me It's Not You (TV show) : Bartender
 2004 : Maktub ("Destiny", TV movie) : Atef, a Druze policeman
 2004 : Walk on Water : Rafik, an Arab Israeli waiter
 2005 : Kvish ("The Road")
 2005 : Telenovela Ltd.
 2006 : Ha 'Alufa ("The Champion", TV series) : Jalal Kasum, a footballer 
 2006 : The Bubble : Ashraf, a Palestinian (starring role)
 2008 : Restless : Arik
 2009 : Agora : Peter, a fanatic Christian leader in 4th-century Alexandria
 2011 : Homeland (American TV show, pilot episode) : Hasan Ibrahim (credited as Yusuf Swade)
 2012 : Hatufim : Abdullah bin Rashid (Season 2 regular)
 2013 : Omar : Torturer
 2015 : Johnny and The Knights of Galilee (Israeli TV show) : Kais
 2015 : False Flag : Amir Cohen (Amir Al-Hamati)
 2016 : The Writer (Israeli TV show) : Kateb
 2016: Game of Thrones : Meereenese freedman
 2018: Tel Aviv on Fire : General Yehuda Edelman
 2019: The Spy : George Seif
 2020: Baghdad Central (TV Mini-Series 2020)
 2020: Unorthodox (Netflix Series 2020)
Sweid also animates the puppet Mahboob ("beloved" in Arabic) in Sesame Street'' on Israel's Hop! channel.

References

External links

 Yousef Sweid on 'The Champion'.

1976 births
Living people
Israeli male dancers
Tel Aviv University alumni
Arab citizens of Israel
Israeli male film actors
Israeli male stage actors
Israeli male television actors
Israeli puppeteers
People from Haifa
Israeli emigrants to Germany
Israeli Arab Christians